Edward Grazda (born 1947) is an American photographer who grew up in Bayside, New York. He studied photography at the Rhode Island School of Design. He has shot extensively throughout Mexico, Afghanistan, Pakistan, Latin America and Asia. His photographs are in the collections of The Museum of Modern Art, The Metropolitan Museum of Art, The New York Public Library, as well as The Corcoran Gallery of Art and The San Francisco Museum of Modern Art.

References 

1947 births
Living people
American photographers
Rhode Island School of Design alumni